The Diet of Porvoo (or unhistorically ;), was the summoned legislative assembly to establish the Grand Duchy of Finland in 1809 and the heir of the powers of the Swedish Riksdag of the Estates. The session of the Diet lasted from March to July 1809.

During the Finnish War between Sweden and Russia, the four Estates of Russian occupied Finland (Nobility, Clergy, Burghers and Peasants) were assembled at Porvoo (Borgå) by Tsar Alexander I, the new Grand Prince of Finland, between 25 March and 19 July 1809. The central event at Porvoo was the sovereign pledge and the oaths of the Estates in Porvoo Cathedral on 29 March. All of the Estates swore their oaths of allegiance, committing themselves to accepting the Emperor as Grand Prince of Finland as the true authority and to keep the constitution and the form of government unchanged. Alexander I subsequently promised to govern Finland in accordance with its laws and let the Finnish keep their religion and rights. This was thought to essentially mean that the emperor confirmed the Swedish Instrument of Government from 1772 as the constitution of Finland, although it was also interpreted to mean respecting the existing codes and statutes.

The diet had required that it would be convened again after the Finnish War, which separated Finland from Sweden, had been concluded. On 17 September, the conflict was settled by the Treaty of Fredrikshamn, but it would take five decades for the Finnish Estates to be called again.

During the rise of Finnish nationalism later in the 19th century, it was claimed that the Diet implied that a treaty between states had been signed at the Diet between Finland and Russia. According to Emeritus Professor Jussila of Helsinki University, it is true that Alexander said that Finland had been raised to the status of a nation among nations, but the claim of a treaty between equals was simply a device invented for the political realities of the struggle for independence.

Participants 
Diet had participants from different estates as follows:

 Nobility 75 representatives, chairman lantmarskalk count Robert Wilhelm De Geer.
 Clergy 8 representatives, chairman bishop of Turku   Jakob Tengström
 Burghers 20 representatives, chairman merchant Kristian Trapp, Turku 
 Peasants 31 representatives, chairman Pehr Klockars Uusikaarlepyy

Out of 205 noble families, 130 were not represented in the diet, and 60 of the representatives did not attend the opening ceremony. The burghers were represented mainly by merchants.

See also 
 Diet of Finland
 Parliament of Finland
 Senate of Finland
 Governor-General of Finland
 Finnish nobility
 Finnish House of Knights and Nobility
 Kingdom of Finland (1742)

References

Further reading
 Karonen, Petri. "Introduction: Sweden, Russia and Finland 1808-1809." The Museum of National Antiquities Stockholm. Studies. (2010).

 Wuorinen, John H. "Appendix A: Alexander I's Act of Assurance, Porvoo Diet, March, 1809, and Decree of April 4, 1809." in A History of Finland (Columbia University Press, 1965) pp. 483-484. online

External links 
History of the Finnish Parliament - Official site
Kejsarens tal vid lantdagens avslutande den 19 juli 1809 - in Swedish at Wikisource (Originally in French)
The Porvoo Diet 1809 - The Beginning of Autonomous Finland Porvoo Town
The Diet of Porvoo 1809

Historical legislatures
Porvoo
Finnish War
Grand Duchy of Finland
Parliament of Finland
1809 in Finland
1809 in politics